Franklin Benjamin Dyer (January 27, 1858–May 10, 1938) was an American educator who served as superintendent of Cincinnati and Boston Public Schools.

Early life
Dyer was born on January 27, 1858, in Warren County, Ohio, to John M. and Margaret (Martin) Dyer. He was educated in public schools and graduated from Ohio Wesleyan University in 1879. In 1888 he married May Archibald. They had three children and resided in Cincinnati's Hyde Park neighborhood until their move to Boston. Dyer was a Methodist and a member of the Republican Party.

Career
After one year teaching at a rural school in Warren County, Dyer spent twenty years as a superintendent of schools in Loveland, Ohio. After a stint in Batavia, Ohio, he spent fourteen years as superintendent in Madisonville, Ohio. In 1901 he became as assistant superintendent of Cincinnati Public Schools. From 1902 to 1903 he served as the first ever dean of the Ohio State Normal School at Miami University.

In 1903, Dyer was appointed superintendent of Cincinnati Public Schools. He established a merit system for hiring teachers while maintaining the cooperation of the older teachers hired through political patronage. With the cooperation of various employers he created the country's first continuation school program, which allowed students who left school to work in a trade to attend school a few days a week. He also created "The Cincinnati Idea", which coordinated parents with the Kindergarten and the Kindergarten with the lower grades. He established the city's Kindergarten, vocational education, and domestic training programs as well as its first system of guidance counseling. He worked with the University of Cincinnati to establish a teacher's college there.

In 1912, Dyer was appointed superintendent of Boston Public Schools. During his tenure he dealt with a student strike, heatwave, polio epidemic, and a staffing shortage caused by World War I. He retired in 1918 and returned to Cincinnati, where he spent twelve years as a member of the city's board of education. He died on May 10, 1938.

References

1858 births
1938 deaths
19th-century American educators
20th-century American educators
Boston Public Schools superintendents
Cincinnati Public Schools superintendents
Educators from Ohio
Methodists from Ohio
Ohio Republicans
Ohio Wesleyan University alumni
People from Warren County, Ohio
People from Cincinnati